Zorica Vojinović (born 27 June 1958 in Crvenka, Serbia, FPR Yugoslavia) is a former Yugoslav/Serbian handball player who competed in the 1980 Summer Olympics.

In 1980 she won the silver medal with the Yugoslav team. She played all five matches and scored two goals.

External links
profile

1958 births
Living people
People from Crvenka
Yugoslav female handball players
Serbian female handball players
Handball players at the 1980 Summer Olympics
Olympic handball players of Yugoslavia
Olympic silver medalists for Yugoslavia
Olympic medalists in handball
Medalists at the 1980 Summer Olympics